GB Class 1 was a series of four trams and two trailers built by Hannoversche Waggonfabrik for Graakalbanen of Trondheim, Norway.

There were two compartments, both with four-abreast seating, with reversible seats.

The trams were taken out of service in 1968 and 1969. Two of the trams and both the trailers were scrapped the same year. No. 4 was kept as a working car until it was scrapped in 1985. No. 3 is preserved as a heritage tram at Trondheim Tramway Museum.

References

Trondheim Tramway stock

600 V DC multiple units
Multiple units of Norway